Ralph George Algernon Percy, 12th Duke of Northumberland,  (born 16 November 1956), styled Lord Ralph Percy until 1995, is a British hereditary peer and rural landowner and current head of the House of Percy.

Early life
Ralph Percy was born the second son (and one of seven children) of Hugh Percy, 10th Duke of Northumberland, and the former Lady Elizabeth Montagu Douglas Scott.

Percy attended Eton College, studied history at the University of Oxford, and then land management at Reading University and worked in the Arundel Castle estate office for seven years, before moving back to Northumberland to manage the Alnwick estate for his elder brother Henry, the 11th Duke.

Duke
Ralph Percy succeeded in the dukedom in 1995 on the death of the 11th duke, who had no offspring. As such, he was a member of the House of Lords until the passing of the House of Lords Act 1999 ended the right of hereditary peers to sit in the House. Hansard records no contributions to House of Lords work by Northumberland.

The Duke assists in managing Northumberland Estates (the corporation holding the ducal assets) which has many venture subsidiaries and associated trusts, which altogether own land and property in Northumberland, Scotland and to a lesser extent London, Surrey and Tyneside. Ralph Percy was ranked at number 248 in the Sunday Times Rich List 2011, with an estimated wealth of £315 million. He or the corporation is the owner of Alnwick Castle, an ancestral ducal seat, as well as Warkworth Castle and Prudhoe Castle in Northumberland; Syon House and Syon Park in London; Hulne Park and Hulne Priory at Alnwick; Albury Park in Surrey, and other listed buildings such as Brizlee Tower.

The 12th Duke's sale on the open market, rather than at a lower price to The National Gallery, of Raphael's Madonna of the Pinks in 2003 was subject to some criticism. At much the same time, in response to a foot-and-mouth disease crisis, the Duke cut the rents of tenant farmers by 10 percent. The Duke has showed opposition to certain wind farms. However, he adopted renewable energy in the restoration of a hydroelectric power generator. The Duke is a sponsor of the NCEA Duke's Secondary School.

On 8 April 2014, despite the vast wealth of the estate, the estate's management announced the date of a new art sale to raise £15 million to cover the costs of the Newburn flood caused by the failure of a culvert for which it was responsible on 25 September 2012. The sales were completed by Sotheby's in July 2014.

In October 2021, the Duke was unsuccessful in his bid to build houses on the site of 37 allotments on his land, after over 900 people signed a petition to save the allotments, which are over a century old, and the local authority's planning committee voted to block the development. This came after the Duke had written to the allotment holders to tell them that if the development was blocked as a result of press coverage, then he would deny them access to the land.

Marriage and children
Northumberland married Jane Richard on 21 July 1979 at Traquair Parish Church. They have four children:

 Lady Catherine Sarah "Katie" Percy (born 23 June 1982), a gunsmith and mechanic
 George Dominic Percy, Earl Percy (born 4 May 1984), heir apparent to the dukedom and managing director of energy company Cluff Geothermal
 Lady Melissa Jane Percy (born 20 May 1987); a fashion designer and former professional tennis player
 Lord Max Ralph Percy (born 26 May 1990)

Arms

References

External links

The Northumberland Estates
Alnwick Castle
Syon Park

1956 births
Living people
People educated at Eton College
21st-century British landowners
Deputy Lieutenants of Northumberland
312
English people of Scottish descent
Northumberland